Cholate—CoA ligase (BAL, bile acid CoA ligase, bile acid coenzyme A ligase, choloyl-CoA synthetase, choloyl coenzyme A synthetase, cholic thiokinase, cholate thiokinase, cholic acid:CoA ligase, 3alpha,7alpha,12alpha-trihydroxy-5beta-cholestanoyl coenzyme A synthetase, 3alpha,7alpha,12alpha-trihydroxy-5beta-cholestanoate-CoA ligase, 3alpha,7alpha,12alpha-trihydroxy-5beta-cholestanoate-CoA synthetase, THCA-CoA ligase, 3alpha,7alpha,12alpha-trihydroxy-5beta-cholestanate—CoA ligase, 3alpha,7alpha,12alpha-trihydroxy-5beta-cholestanate:CoA ligase (AMP-forming), cholyl-CoA synthetase, trihydroxycoprostanoyl-CoA synthetase) is an enzyme with systematic name cholate:CoA ligase (AMP-forming). This enzyme catalyses the following chemical reaction

 (1) ATP + cholate + CoA  AMP + diphosphate + choloyl-CoA
 (2) ATP + (25R)-3alpha,7alpha,12alpha-trihydroxy-5beta-cholestan-26-oate + CoA  AMP + diphosphate + (25R)-3alpha,7alpha,12alpha-trihydroxy-5beta-cholestanoyl-CoA

This enzyme requires Mg2+ for activity.

References

External links 
 

EC 6.2.1